Ribes canthariforme is a rare species of currant commonly known as the Moreno currant. It is characterized by pink to red flowers, a dense inflorescence, and a lack of nodal spines. A little-known endemic to the mountains of San Diego County, it is usually found growing the shade of massive boulders in the chaparral. Although the rarity and small numbers of this plant is a conservation concern, it is usually found in remote areas and is well hidden enough to be safe from most threats.

Description 

The stems stand erect and are covered in a fine pubescence, and lack the notable spines and prickles on the nodes and internodes of other Ribes species. The upper surface of the leaf is green, and covered in wavy, long, soft hairs, while the lower surface is a gray-green, and covered in dense hairs. The leaf margins are crenate, and have gland-tipped teeth.

Flowers are produced from February to April. The inflorescence is a dense, drooping, spike or head-like structure, with the flowers crowded into the distal third. The flower is colored a rose-purple to pale rose-purple. The hypanthium is broadly urn-shaped, wider than it is long, and covered in villous-pubescent and gland-tipped hairs. The styles are free, their bases sparsely hairy.

Distribution and habitat

Distribution 
Ribes canthariforme is endemic to the western Peninsular Ranges of San Diego County, California. Localities include Barona Valley, El Cajon Mountain, Descanso Junction, Lyons Peak, Corte Madera, and next to Morena Dam, where the type specimen was collected on a northeast-facing slope among rocks and boulders. The range of this plant does not correspond closely to other species in the region that are restricted to similar habitats, and the distinctive appearance lacks any superficial similarity to other local Ribes species, suggesting a relictual component to its distribution.

There is one herbarium record of this species from the Santa Ana Mountains in Orange County. A record of this species from the San Jacinto Mountains in Riverside County was incorrectly identified and later determined to be Ribes malvaceum var. viridifolium. Although the range of this species comes close to the Mexico–United States border, it has not been located in Baja California.

Reiser (2001) suggested the aesthetic appeal of Ribes canthariforme may make it an attractive ornamental plant. Plants of this species collected at the type locality (Moreno Dam) have been successfully cultivated at the Botanical Garden of Tilden Regional Park.

Habitat 
Ribes canthariforme grows in chaparral habitats in areas of acid igneous rockland. R. canthariforme is usually hidden from the rest of the chaparral vegetation as it usually grows in the shaded sides of large exposed boulders, although some may be found away from the boulders in other sheltered places. The association this species has with large boulders, rocky ravines and sheltered areas is probably because of the water harvesting benefits and extra moisture produced by the shade.

Estimates from 2005 indicated that about 70 individual plants remained. Most of these occur on land within Cleveland National Forest, and since there are few serious threats the species is not otherwise specifically protected.

See also
 California chaparral and woodlands

References

External links
Treated in: 
Jepson Manual Treatment
Calphotos Photo gallery, University of California

canthariforme
Endemic flora of California
Natural history of the California chaparral and woodlands
Natural history of the Peninsular Ranges
Natural history of San Diego County, California
~
Critically endangered flora of California
Plants described in 1929